Mario E. Martínez Guzmán (born 12 September 1961) is a former professional tennis player from Bolivia.

Tennis career
Martínez achieved a career-high singles ranking of world No. 35 in September 1983.

He participated in three Davis Cup ties for Bolivia from 1977–1978 and one more in 1988, posting a 3–5 record in singles and an 0–2 record in doubles.

Career finals

Singles (5 titles, 3 runner-ups)

References

External links
 
 
 

1961 births
Living people
Bolivian male tennis players
Sportspeople from La Paz